Christopher Stephen Lehane (born June 2, 1967) is an American political consultant  who has served as a lawyer, spokesperson and expert in opposition research for the Clinton White House, Democratic candidates for public office and various business, Labor, entertainment and professional sports organizations. A graduate of Amherst College and Harvard Law School, he was a lawyer and spokesperson in the Clinton White House where he and his current business partner Mark Fabiani were called the Masters of Disaster by Newsweek magazine for their part in a "rapid-response" team employed to respond to the increasing number of investigations of the Clinton Administration. In 2012, Lehane co-authored a book on damage control titled Masters of Disaster published by Palgrave, MacMillan's academic imprint. He also wrote and produced the film Knife Fight, a political satire acquired by IFC and released in January 2013.

From 2015 until 2022, Lehane served as the Head of Global Policy and Public Affairs for home-sharing startup Airbnb. He joined Haun Ventures, a crypto investment firm, in 2022.

Political work
In 1992, Lehane was the political director of the Clinton-Gore presidential campaign in Maine, and was later brought into the White House where he served as a lawyer in the White House Counsel's Office who worked as part of a small unit responsible for helping the White House manage various scandals throughout the 1990s such as Whitewater and the Monica Lewinsky affair.

In 1995 Lehane authored a 332-page memo on a media "conspiracy" against the Clintons, of which only 2 and a half pages are written text; the remainder being newspaper and internet clippings. This report, named "The communication stream of conspiracy commerce" was the origin of the phrase "vast right-wing conspiracy" that is often attributed to Hillary Clinton.

In the 2000 Presidential campaign, Lehane served as the Press Secretary for Vice President Al Gore. Lehane was credited with improving Gore's press relations with the press corps, his one liners and for his opposition research work. In his 2010 book, President George W. Bush's top political strategist Karl Rove, call him "one of the Democratic Party’s best opposition researchers" credited Lehane's making public George W. Bush's DWI history just before the election as the basis for Gore winning the popular vote in the 2000 presidential election. Lehane has done work for other leading political figures in the U.S., including New York Attorney General Andrew Cuomo and former California Governor Gray Davis.

The New York Times labeled Lehane the "Master of the Political Dark Arts" for his opposition research work on behalf of the failed Wesley Clark bid for the 2004 nomination when he mounted considerable efforts to derail the Howard Dean bid, portraying him as hypocritical, dishonest, and inconsistent.

In 2007, Lehane helped create the Lincoln Brigade, an organization that defeated a Republican sponsored ballot initiative designed to change how California divides up its Electoral College votes.

In April 2009, Lehane and Republican political consultant Steve Schmidt opened a ballot initiative political firm.  Lehane has served as a strategist on various statewide ballot campaigns, including running the "no" side to a Republican Party sponsored Electoral College initiative; Labor's Proposition 17; and the effort to pass California Proposition 19, or the Regulate, Control and Tax Cannabis Act of 2010 and other statewide and local initiatives.

In 2010, Lehane helped launch Level The Playing Field an independent expenditure organization backed by organized Labor designed to target Republican gubernatorial candidate Meg Whitman.

In 2010 Lehane was a lead strategist on No On 23, the successful effort to beat back the oil industry's effort to overturn California's precedent using climate change laws. He was active in the June 2012 campaign to raise the tobacco tax in California and is the lead strategist for Proposition 39, the Clean Energy Jobs initiative, which seeks to close an existing loop-hole in the California state tax code that provides a more favorable tax treatment for out of state companies who do business in California compared to in state companies. He serves on the board of advisors for various high tech companies, non-profit boards, including as member of the Board of Trustees of Amherst College.

Lehane is often included in discussions of bare knuckled methodologies employed by political campaign consultants, including feeding information to selected media outlets. Lehane often works as a television commentator and a frequent op-ed contributor.

In May 2015 Lehane assessed Republican Marco Rubio as a "Dan Quayle without the experience” in the field of potential opponents to Democratic frontrunner Hillary Clinton.

Business work
Lehane and his partner Mark Fabiani are retained to represent various corporate, Labor, entertainment and sports organizations. Lehane is often quoted as an expert on crisis management. Lehane's firm has  represented California Edison during the California Energy crisis, Goldman Sachs during the financial crisis, Cisco Systems when the Internet bubble burst, Lance Armstrong on various matters, Al Gore's Current TV when it fired Keith Olbermann; Madonna in relation to the Kabbalah Center and her charity in Africa; Rob Reiner and First Five; Hollywood studios, Indian tribes and other leading businesses.

Lehane does significant sports work having represented the National Hockey League, the City of Sacramento in its effort to build a new sports and entertainment complex, the Big East, Marion Jones and the San Diego Chargers.

Lehane's entertainment work has included helping Michael Moore with his films such as Fahrenheit 911 and Sicko; and "orchestrat"ing News Corp.-funded Don't Count Us Out campaign against the Nielsen Media Research relating to concerns that minority viewership was being undercounted.

Lehane has worked for consumer groups, trial lawyers and helped lead organized Labor's opposition to California Governor Arnold Schwarzenegger's agenda in California.

Book
Lehane is co-author, along with his business partner Mark Fabiani and Stanford Business School Professor Bill Guttentag, of Masters of Disaster: The Ten Commandments of Damage Control.

Film
He is also a writer and producer of Knife Fight, a political satire acquired by IFC that consider whether the ends justify the means and stars Rob Lowe as a political fixer dealing with a series of scandals.  The film features an ensemble cast that includes Julie Bowen, Eric McCormack, Richard Schiff, Carrie-Anne Moss and Jamie Chung. The film premiered at the Tribeca Film Festival where the satire was reviewed as "entertaining," "fun," "at once wise, witty, and extremely funny" and “a nostalgic kick” for political junkies.

References

1967 births
American political consultants
Amherst College alumni
Clinton administration personnel
Harvard Law School alumni
Living people